The Rio Theatre is an independent, multidisciplinary art house in Vancouver, BC, Canada. Built in 1938, the Rio served East Vancouver primarily as a movie theatre until 2008, when new owners began to add live music and multimedia and multidisciplinary art events.

The Rio seats 420 people, including a balcony section. The projection room houses both a vintage 35-millimetre projector and a 3D digital projector added in 2010. The venue includes a lobby with concession voted best in 2010 and 2011 for single screen theatres in Vancouver, a large stage, and a backstage greenroom for live performers.

Since its evolution in 2008, the Rio has hosted Hollywood blockbusters, local independent filmmakers, midnight screenings of cult classics, the toddler-friendly "Movies for Mommies" series, local and international film festivals, comedy festivals, queer film events, burlesque shows, screenings and tours for local public schools, political events, religious services, spoken word and other live performances, and local and international live music.

The Dear Rouge song "Meet Me At The Rio" is about the venue.

Dispute with British Columbia Liquor Control and Licensing Branch
According to owner Corinne Lea, the Rio was at risk of business failure under a movies-only model, as indicated by the failure of all but two single-screen theatres in Vancouver by the end of 2011. In 2010, Lea applied for a primary liquor license from the British Columbia Liquor Control and Licensing Branch, in order to attract more live music events where alcohol could be served. When the license was presented to Ms. Lea on January 18, 2012, the LCLB had inserted a condition, unique among any primary liquor license holder in the province, that "This establishment is not permitted to show movies or any type of cinematic screenings at any time," effectively banning The Rio from screening films at any point in the future, regardless of whether alcohol is being served. Lea has said she felt she had no choice but to sign the license or the Rio would need to shut its doors.

Response to the LCLB decision has ranged from a Facebook-centred community political action campaign, targeting the LCLB and provincial MLAs to intervene, to national media attention. Proponents involved in assisting the Rio Theatre in the short term, who are also calling on the province of British Columbia to amend its antiquated liquor laws in the long term, include BC MLA Spencer Chandra Herbert, City of Vancouver Councillor Heather Deal, and Vancouver Mayor Gregor Robertson, among others. There are no known opponents to the newly licensed Rio Theatre also continuing to show unlicensed general-admission movies.

In response, the LCLB claimed that it was not able to alter its procedures due to the Regulations of the BC Liquor Control and Licensing Act. The LCLB also stated that it was acting in the interests of "public safety" to prevent the possibility of minors consuming alcohol "in the dark," despite the fact that the Rio had agreed to not sell alcohol during general admission film screenings. ON February 9, 2012, the B.C. Government announced that they were making changes to the province's liquor licensing rules to allow venues that serve alcohol to also screen movies, albeit at different times.

However, this was not the win they were fighting for, Corinne Lea did not accept these limited restrictions placed on her business. She kept on with her campaign to change the BC liquor laws so that alcohol could be served during movies and live events. The battle took four months in total, while  The Rio Theatre struggled to survive, going severely in debt during this time. In April 2012 the BC Liquor laws were finally changed to allow all movie theatres with a Primary liquor license in BC to serve alcohol during film screenings. Later in January 2013 Corinne Lea was awarded a Diamond Jubilee Governor General award for her successful battle to change the liquor laws.

References

External links
 Rio Theatre website
 Grounded News mini-documentary, January 23, 2012

Theatres in Vancouver
Cinemas and movie theatres in Vancouver
Repertory cinemas